Hajji Hasan-e Olya (also Romanized as Ḩājjī Ḩasan-e ‘Olyā; also known as Ḩājjī Ḩasan, Ḩājjī Ḩasan-e Bālā, and Ḩājj Ḩasan-e ‘Olyā) is a village in Zarrineh Rud Rural District, in the Central District of Miandoab County, West Azerbaijan Province, Iran. At the 2006 census, its population was 529, in 114 families.

References 

Populated places in Miandoab County